Muhammad Ali Malkani is a Pakistani politician who has been a Member of the Provincial Assembly of Sindh, from May 2013 to May 2018.

Early life and education
He was born on 22 November 1966.

He has done graduation.

Political career

He was elected to the Provincial Assembly of Sindh as a candidate of Pakistan Peoples Party from Constituency PS-87 THATTA-IV in 2013 Pakistani general election. In August 2016, he was into Sindh's provincial cabinet of Chief Minister Syed Murad Ali Shah and was made Provincial Minister of Sindh for livestock and fisheries. In May 2017, he was given the additional ministerial portfolio of Environment, Climate Change and Coastal Development.

References

Living people
Sindh MPAs 2013–2018
1966 births
Pakistan People's Party MPAs (Sindh)